Francisca Eugénia da Silva Dias Van Dunem (born 5 November 1955, in Luanda, Angola) is an Angolan-Portuguese lawyer and politician who served as the Portuguese Minister of Justice from 26 November 2015 to 30 March 2022, in António Costa's XXI and XXII Constitutional Governments, and  Minister of Internal Administration from 4 December 2021 to 30 March 2022. Van Dunem is Portugal's first black government minister in history.

Early life and education
Van Dunem was born in 1955 in Luanda, then the capital of the Portuguese Overseas Province of Angola. She went to Lisbon in the early 1970s in order to study law at the University of Lisbon. In April 1974, the Portuguese Estado Novo regime was overthrown by a left-wing military coup and in 1975 Angola become a newly independent communist state - the People's Republic of Angola. Her brother José Van Dunem was murdered in a purge occurred in Agostinho Neto's post-independence Angola that same year. Francisca did not return to Angola and pursued a family life and a professional career in Portugal. 

Van Dunem holds a degree in Law from the Faculty of Law of the University of Lisbon, awarded in 1977. She was subject to competitive examination for the Portuguese Public Prosecutor's office in 1979.

Professional career
Van Dunem's most relevant professional activities included judicial activities such as Trainee Deputy Public Prosecutor (Lisbon and Loures courts) (1979-1980); Deputy Public Prosecutor (Lisbon Labour Court) (1980-1983); Deputy Public Prosecutor (Lisbon Criminal Court) (1983-1985); Deputy Public Prosecutor (Lisbon Public Prosecution Service) (1987-1989); member of the Principal State Prosecutor's private law firm (1989-2001); and Deputy Principal State Prosecutor, Director of the Lisbon Public Prosecution Service (since 2001).

Van Dunem first served as Minister of Justice in the 21st Portuguese government (2015-2019).

In early 2021, Van Dunem faced calls for resignation amid revelations that her ministry had overstated the qualifications of its nominee for Portugal’s seat at the European Public Prosecutor's Office (EPPO). 

In 4 December 2021 Van Dunem was nominated as  Minister of Internal Administration after Eduardo Cabrita's resignation, heading both Ministries of  Justice and  Internal Administration.

Personal life
Van Dunem is married and has one son. They live in the Greater Lisbon area.

References

Living people
1955 births
Portuguese women lawyers
People from Luanda
University of Lisbon alumni
Women government ministers of Portugal
Justice ministers of Portugal
Female justice ministers
Portuguese people of Angolan descent
Independent politicians in Portugal
21st-century Portuguese women politicians
21st-century Portuguese politicians